Pierpaolo Spangaro (26 June 1942 – 12 August 2011) was an Italian swimmer. He competed at the 1960 Summer Olympics and the 1964 Summer Olympics.

References

1942 births
2011 deaths
Italian male swimmers
Olympic swimmers of Italy
Swimmers at the 1960 Summer Olympics
Swimmers at the 1964 Summer Olympics
Sportspeople from Trieste
Universiade medalists in swimming
Universiade bronze medalists for Italy
Medalists at the 1963 Summer Universiade